Eumysia is a genus of snout moths. It was described by Harrison Gray Dyar Jr. in 1925.

Species
Eumysia fuscatella (Hulst, 1900)
Eumysia idahoensis Mackie, 1958
Eumysia maidella (Dyar, 1905)
Eumysia mysiella (Dyar, 1905)
Eumysia pallidipennella (Hulst, 1895)
Eumysia semicana Heinrich, 1956

References

Phycitinae